Bharatpur is a city in the Indian state of Rajasthan,  south of India's capital, New Delhi,  from Rajasthan's capital Jaipur,  west of Agra of Uttar Pradesh and  from Mathura of Uttar Pradesh. It is the administrative headquarters of Bharatpur District and the headquarters of Bharatpur Division of Rajasthan State. Bharatpur is part of National Capital Region of India. The city was the capital of the Bharatpur State. It became a municipal corporation with 65 wards in 2014.

Fairs and festivals
 Braj Holi Festival
 Jaswant exhibition and fair during Dussehra
 Numaish exhibition and fair

Demographics

 Indian census,

Tourist attraction 
 Keoladeo national park
 Lohagarh Fort
 Deeg palace
 Bayana
 Ganga Mandir
 Banke bihari temple
 Kishori Mahal
 Laxman Mandir

Further reading

Imperial Gazetteer of India Vol 8, P-73 Bharatpur State
R. C. Majumdar, H. C. Raychaudhury, Kalikaranjan Datta: An Advanced History of India, fourth edition, 1978, p. 535-36
Female infanticide and child marriage

References

 
Cities and towns in Bharatpur district